The Northern Mariana Islands Men's National Basketball Team is the basketball team that represents the Northern Mariana Islands in international competitions.

Current extended squad
Coach Rufion Aguon
Ed Diaz of Michelob-Master Construction Torque
Edsel Mendoza (-F) of Bud Light-Toyota Tundra
John Joyner (-F) of MARPAC-Nissan Titans
Dan Barcinas of O'Douls-Ol'Aces
Kelvin Fitial of MARPAC-Nissan Titans
Jeremy Sablan of Bud Ice-SaipanCell Hoopaholics
Melvin Manibusan
Mark Wallace
Steve Rasa of MARPAC-Nissan Titans
Shan Seman of O'Douls-Ol'Aces
Jack Lizama (-F) of O'Douls-Ol'Aces
Aleric Aguon of MARPAC-Nissan Titans
Justin Fejeran
Gus Palacios
James Lee
Dexter Mendiola

Competitive record

FIBA Oceania Championship
Never participated

Pacific Games

 1983-2007: ?
 2011-2015: Did not participate
 2019: To be determined

Oceania Basketball Tournament

 1985-2013: ?

Melanesia Basketball Cup

Never participated

See also
Northern Mariana Islands women's national basketball team

References

External links
Official website of the Mariana Islands Basketball Federation - MBF
Northern Mariana Islands at Australiabasket.com

Men's national basketball teams
Basketball
1981 establishments in the Northern Mariana Islands